Luiz Felipe Rodrigues Marques (born 16 February 1985), known as Luiz Felipe, is a Brazilian footballer who plays for Clube de Regatas Brasil as a right defender.

Honours
Brazilian Second Division: 2005
Rio Grande do Sul State League: 2006

External links
Luiz Felipe at CBF  

1985 births
Sportspeople from Rio Grande do Sul
Living people
Brazilian footballers
Association football defenders
Grêmio Foot-Ball Porto Alegrense players
América Futebol Clube (MG) players
Vila Nova Futebol Clube players
Esporte Clube Juventude players
Clube de Regatas Brasil players